Jamie Edward George (born 20 October 1990) is an English professional rugby union player who plays at hooker for Saracens in the Gallagher Premiership. He has also represented the England Rugby Team at under-16, under-18, under-20 level and represented the senior side at the 2015 and 2019 Rugby World Cup.

Early life 
George played for local team Hertford Rugby Football Club in his youth, until he was asked to join the Saracens Academy. 

George was educated at Haileybury and Imperial Service College and was captain of the Haileybury 1st XV for two years, in Lower Sixth and Upper Sixth, whilst also being a regular for the 1st XV in Y11. He is an Aston Villa fan.

Saracens 
George has played for Saracens since 2009 after training in the Saracens Academy from the age of 14. He had a short loan spell at Southend Saxons in the lower tiers of English rugby in 2008-09, however quickly caught the attention of Bobby Walsh in the Saracens management team to return the following season.

2009-10 season 
In November 2009 George made his professional club debut for the Saracens first team against Northampton Saints in the Anglo-Welsh Cup. However this was the only appearance he was to make that season. He continued his development playing for the Saracens Storm in the A league.

2010-11 season 
The 2010–11 season was George's first season for the Saracens first team. He played most of the season as an understudy to Schalk Brits who he described as "one of the most talented blokes I’ve ever met in my life". In the season he made 20 appearances and scored two tries, helping Saracens to secure a home semi-final in the Premiership. He was an unused substitute in the final as Saracens defeated Leicester Tigers to win their first ever league title.

2013-14 season 
In May 2014 George was a second half replacement in the final of the European Rugby Champions Cup as they finished runners up to Toulon and the following weekend saw Saracens lose to Northampton Saints in the Premiership final.

2014-15 season 
George started the 2015 Premiership Final, and was the centre of added pressure and attention due to his promotion to the England squad. George responded well and starred during the match against Bath, running in one try from over 30-metres out, and passing the ball to Chris Wyles for his try.

2015-16 season 
On 14 May 2016 George was a second half replacement in the final of the European Rugby Champions Cup as Saracens beat Racing 92 to become champions of Europe for the first time. Later that month they defeated Exeter Chiefs to complete their first ever domestic and European double.

2016-17 season 
In the 2016-17 season George started for the side that defeated ASM Clermont Auvergne at Murrayfield to retain their European title.

2017-18 season 
In the 2017-18 season George won his fourth Premiership title with Saracens as they were victorious against Exeter in the final.

2018-19 season 
George started for the team as they repeated their domestic and European double achievement of 2015-2016. They beat Leinster in the European Rugby Champions Cup final at St James' Park to become European champions for the third time in four years. He then scored two tries in the Premiership final as Saracens defeated Exeter Chiefs to retain their league title.

2019-20 season 
In July 2020, George signed a new three-year contract with Saracens. However this deal ensured that he would play in the RFU Championship the following season, after his club were relegated following breach of salary cap.

2020-21 season  
George scored a try in the Championship play-off final as Saracens defeated Ealing Trailfinders to gain promotion and an immediate return to the top flight.

International career

England
George started for the England side that finished runners up to New Zealand at the 2009 IRB Junior World Championship. He scored a try against Wales during the 2010 Six Nations Under 20s Championship and was a member of the squad that finished fourth at the 2010 IRB Junior World Championship. In January 2014 George represented the England A team against Ireland Wolfhounds and Scotland A.

On 29 May 2015 George was promoted to England's extended 50-man training squad for the 2015 Rugby World Cup. He had replaced veteran Dylan Hartley in the squad after Hartley was suspended for head-butting George in a Saracens vs Northampton Saints fixture. On 22 August 2015 George made his Test debut replacing Tom Youngs in a World Cup warm Up fixture against France and five days later he was included in coach Stuart Lancaster's 31-man squad for the 2015 Rugby World Cup. His only appearance during the tournament came in their final pool fixture against Uruguay as the hosts failed to reach the knockout phase.

In January 2016, George was announced in new coach Eddie Jones' first senior England squad for the 2016 Six Nations Championship and on 6 February 2016 made his first tournament appearance as a replacement for captain Hartley in their opening round 15–9 victory against Scotland. England went on to complete the Grand Slam. Later that year George scored his first international try in the final test of their summer tour of Australia to complete a series whitewash. England retained their title during the 2017 Six Nations Championship, missing out on a consecutive grand slam with defeat in the final game away to Ireland which also brought an end to a record equalling eighteen successive Test victories.

George was included in the squad for the 2019 Rugby World Cup and scored a try in their opening pool fixture against Tonga. He started all three knockout games against Australia in the quarter-final, victory over New Zealand in the semi-final and defeat to South Africa in the final as England finished runners up.

On 31 October 2020 George scored a try on his 50th cap as England defeated Italy to win the 2020 Six Nations Championship. The following month saw him become the first hooker to score a hat-trick for the England men's team in their opening fixture of the Autumn Nations Cup against Georgia. He also started in the final of that competition as England defeated France in extra-time to win the tournament.

British and Irish Lions
George was selected as a member of the 2017 British & Irish Lions squad. George featured in six matches on the tour including against the Māori All Blacks. The opening Test against New Zealand was his first international start having previously played all seventeen of his England caps coming off the bench, a world record for most tests without a start. George played the full 80 minutes in the second test, setting up Conor Murray's winning try. He started the draw in the final match as the series ended level.

George was also picked by coach Warren Gatland for the 2021 British & Irish Lions tour to South Africa. He played in the game against Japan but did not participate in the Test series.

International tries

Honours
England
 Six Nations Championship: 2016, 2017, 2020
 Autumn Nations Cup: 2020
 Rugby World Cup runner-up: 2019

Saracens
 European Rugby Champions Cup: 2015–16, 2016-17, 2018-19
 Premiership: 2010-11, 2014-15, 2015-16, 2017-18, 2018-19
 RFU Championship: 2020-21

 European Rugby Champions Cup runner up: 2013-14
 Premiership runner up: 2013-14

References

External links 
 
 England profile
 Saracens profile

1990 births
Living people
British & Irish Lions rugby union players from England
England international rugby union players
English rugby union players
People educated at Haileybury and Imperial Service College
Rugby union hookers
Rugby union players from Welwyn Garden City
Saracens F.C. players